Hassan Kamal (born 1 July 1964) is an Iraqi former footballer. He competed in the men's tournament at the 1988 Summer Olympics, and currently manages Iraq U17.

References

External links
 
 

1964 births
Living people
Iraqi footballers
Iraq international footballers
Olympic footballers of Iraq
Footballers at the 1988 Summer Olympics
Place of birth missing (living people)
Association football defenders
Al-Jaish Damascus players